Monica Havelka (April 21, 1956 – July 12, 2009) was an American rower. She competed in the women's double sculls event at the 1988 Summer Olympics. Prior to rowing at the Olympics, she played basketball.

References

External links
 

1956 births
2009 deaths
American female rowers
American women's basketball players
Olympic rowers of the United States
Rowers at the 1988 Summer Olympics
Sportspeople from Santa Ana, California
Pan American Games medalists in rowing
Pan American Games gold medalists for the United States
Rowers at the 1983 Pan American Games
20th-century American women
21st-century American women